Balanitis plasmacellularis is a cutaneous condition characterized by a benign inflammatory skin lesion characterized histologically by a plasma cell infiltrate.

A similar condition has been described in women (i.e. "Zoon's vulvitis"), although its existence is controversial due to the possibility of diagnostic error in many of the cases that have been reported in the medical literature.

It is named for J.J. Zoon, who characterized it in 1952.

See also 
 Balanitis
 Pseudoepitheliomatous keratotic and micaceous balanitis
 Skin lesion
 List of cutaneous conditions

References

External links 

Epidermal nevi, neoplasms, and cysts